Troglotroctes ashmolearum is a wingless insect of the order Psocoptera, in the Liposcelididae family, found only on Ascension Island.

References 

Troctomorpha
Fauna of Ascension Island